Opharus flavicostata is a moth of the family Erebidae. It was described by Paul Dognin in 1901. It is found in Colombia.

References

Opharus
Moths described in 1901
Moths of South America